The Wurzweiler School of Social Work at Yeshiva University was founded in 1957. It is a methods-based institution offering concentrations in clinical casework, social group work, and community social work. Fieldwork is an integral part of the curriculum. Classes are held at Yeshiva University’s Wilf campus, in New York’s Washington Heights neighborhood, and Beren campus, in New York’s Murray Hill neighborhood.

Wurzweiler's nationally accredited curriculum is further informed by conferences on cutting-edge topics including HIV/AIDS, domestic violence, human trafficking, bereavement, trauma, and social action.

The school’s unique nature stems from an historic emphasis on values and ethics, respect for ethnicity, and recognition of the importance of religious beliefs and spirituality.

Previous deans of Wurzweiler have included Sheldon R. Gelman, Ph.D. and Carmen Ortiz Hendricks, DSW. The current Dorothy and David Schachne Dean is Danielle Wozniak, MSW, Ph.D., with Jay Sweifach LCSW, DSW serving as Associate Dean & Director of the PhD Program.

Academics 

Wurzweiler offers the following degrees:
 M.S.W.
 Online M.S.W
 Ph.D. in Social Welfare
 Certificate in Jewish Communal Service

The Silvia and Irwin Leiferman Center for Professional Training in the Care of the Elderly provides opportunities in gerontology education at the master’s and doctoral levels.

The Wurzweiler School was founded to serve the needs of Jewish communal agencies for well-educated social workers. Through the recent years of its existence, this emphasis has been diluted. In its initial years, the Wurzeweiler School was known for the high quality manifested in all aspects of its operation. This led to its involvement in starting schools of social work at Bar Ilan University in Israel and in Lusaka, Northern Rhodesia (now Zambia).

Notable alumni
 Noach Dear (1953–2020), New York Supreme Court judge

External links 

 
 What’s New at Wurzweiler blog: http://newatwurz.blogspot.com/
 Wurzweiler journals: http://www.yu.edu/wurzweiler/index_sub.asp?id=2861

Yeshiva University
Schools of social work in the United States
1957 establishments in New York City